Parvin Kheirbakhsh better known as Forouzan  (9 August 1937 – 24 January 2016) was an Iranian actress, producer, and dubbing artist.

She started her cinematic career as a voice-over actress. In 1964 she starred in Siamak Yasemi's Sāhele Entezār, but it was Ganj-e Qarun, another film by Yasemi, that made her very famous. She co-starred in this film with Fardin. After Ganj-e Qarun Fardin and Forouzan made a golden cinematic couple and co-starred in some of the highest-grossing films of the era, known as Persian Films or Film Farsi (in Persian: فیلم فارسی). Persian Film was the popular genre of movies produced in Iran before the Iranian revolution of 1979.

Biography
Forouzan was born on 9 August 1937 in Bandar-e Anzali, Iran. She started her career by dubbing films. Her first movie was Sahel-e Entezar. She acted in many popular Iranian films and also worked with visionary directors of the Mowj-e Now, such as Dariush Mehrjui (Dayere-ye Mina) and Ali Hatami (Baba Shamal).

Siamak Yasemi, Iraj Ghaderi, Shapur Gharib and Fereydun Goleh were some of the other famous directors that she collaborated with.

After the 1979 revolution Forouzan was banned from playing in movies and grew more and more isolated. She rarely conducted interviews and died on 24 January 2016 in Tehran.

After Forouzan's death, Persian-language websites and forums dedicated posts and articles in her memory. Her popularity remained intact despite not having acted in a new film since 1978.

Partial filmography

1963: Sahele entezar - Maryam
1964: The Humans - Goli
1964: The Pleasures of Sin - Sahar
1965: Gate of Fate
1965: Darvazehe taghdir
1965: The Bride of the Sea - Maryam
1965: Croesus' Treasure - Ganjeh Gharoon
1965: Dah saye khatarnak - Sepideh
1966: Shookhi nakon delkhor misham - Assal
1966: Shamsi pahlevoon - Shamsi
1966: Hashem khan - Mina
1966: Farar az haghighat
1967: Valley of Death
1967: Haft shahr-e eshgh
1967: Gohar-e shab-cheragh
1967: Dalahoo - Arezoo
1968: Shokoh-e-javanmardi
1968: Yusuf ile Züleyha - Züleyha
1968: The Dragon Gorge
1968: Tahran macerasi
1968: Setare-ye haft-asemoon
1968: Ghoroube botparastan
1968: The Daughter of the King of Fairies
1968: Charkh-E-Bazigar
1968: Chahar darvish
1968: Bazee-e Eshgh
1968: Separate beds
1968: It's Written in the Stars
1969: Tak-khal
1969: Shar-ashoob
1969: Setare-ye foroozan
1969: Mojeze-ye ghalbha
1969: Malek-e doozakh
1969: A Girl Is Going to Die Tonight
1969: Büyük yemin
1969: The Great Oath - Firuzan
1970: Mardi az jonoob-e shahr - Atash
1970: Sogoli
1970: Ram karadan-e mard-e vahshi
1970: Raghaseye shahr - Pari
1970: Jafar var Golnar - Golnar
1970: Bride of Bianca
1971: Ayyoob - Shahin / Maryam / Shirin
1971: Baba Shamal - Shokat-ol-molook
1971: Khosghel-e mahalle - Nazi
1971: Heydar - Aghdas
1971: Badnaam - Badri
1971: Atashpare-ye shahr
1972: Zafar
1972: Sahere
1972: Mikhak-e sefid
1972: Khaterkhah
1972: Ghalandar - Eshrat
1972: The Dagger - Banafsheh
1973: Parizad
1973: Nakhoda - Darya
1975: Gharar-e bozorg - Shirin
1976: Khodahafez koochooloo
1977: The Cycle - Zahra
1977: Back and Dagger - Pari (final film role)

Gallery

References

External links

1937 births
2016 deaths
People from Bandar-e Anzali
People from Tehran
Iranian film actresses
Iranian voice actresses
Burials at artist's block of Behesht-e Zahra